Desmidorchis is a genus of flowering plants belonging to the family Apocynaceae.

Its native range is Sahara and Sahel to Eastern Tropical Africa, Arabian Peninsula.

Species:

Desmidorchis adenensis 
Desmidorchis arabica 
Desmidorchis aucheriana 
Desmidorchis awdeliana 
Desmidorchis edithiae 
Desmidorchis flava 
Desmidorchis foetida 
Desmidorchis impostor 
Desmidorchis lavrani 
Desmidorchis penicillata 
Desmidorchis retrospiciens 
Desmidorchis somalica 
Desmidorchis speciosa 
Desmidorchis tardellii

References

Apocynaceae
Apocynaceae genera
Taxa named by Christian Gottfried Ehrenberg